Macchia is a frazione of the comune of Giarre, province of Catania, in the island of Sicily, Italy.

References

External links

Frazioni of the Province of Catania